Mohamed Kabia (born 4 October 1988) is a Sierra Leonean footballer who plays as a forward.

References

External links

1988 births
Living people
Association football forwards
Syrianska FC players
Allsvenskan players
Sierra Leonean footballers
Sierra Leone international footballers
Sierra Leonean expatriate sportspeople in Sweden
Sierra Leonean expatriate footballers
Expatriate footballers in Sweden
Sportspeople from Freetown